This is a timeline of Australian history, comprising important legal and territorial changes and political events in Australia and its predecessor states.  To read about the background to these events, see history of Australia.  See also the list of prime ministers of Australia.

16th century

17th century

18th century

19th century

20th century

21st century

See also
 History of Western Australia
 Timeline of Adelaide
 Timeline of Brisbane
 Timeline of Darwin
 Timeline of Gold Coast, Queensland
 Timeline of Melbourne
 Timeline of Sydney
 Timeline of Tasmania

References

 
Australia